Merry&Hell Go Round is the second mini-album by Olivia Lufkin, released on June 27, 2003 under the labels Avex Trax Tower Records Japan.

Track listing
 "SpiderSpins"
 "Denial"
 "Blind Unicorn"
 "Cupid"
 "Sugarbloodsuckers"

References

Olivia Lufkin albums
2003 EPs
Avex Group EPs